Ogwa is a village in southeastern Nigeria. It is located in Mbaitoli local government area in Imo State.

Populated places in Imo State